Sloboda was a type of settlement in Belarus, Russia, Ukraine and other Slavic states.

Sloboda, Svoboda or similar means freedom or liberty in the Slavic languages and may also refer to:
Sloboda (surname)
FK Sloboda Tuzla, a football club in Bosnia and Herzegovina
FK Sloboda Užice
FK Sloboda Novi Grad
Sloboda Ukraine, a historical region of Ukraine
Sloboda Čačak, a Serbian defense manufacture company
Sloboda (rural locality), name of several rural localities in Russia
Słoboda, Podlaskie Voivodeship, Poland
Słoboda, Podkarpackie Voivodeship, Poland
Sloboda-Komarivtsi, Ukraine

See also
Slobozia (disambiguation)
Slobodskoy (disambiguation)
Svoboda (disambiguation), cognate spelling